The 2013 African U-20 Championship officially known as the Orange African U-20 Championship, Algeria 2013 was the 19th edition of the African U-20 Championship. The competition was held in Algeria in the cities of Oran and Aïn Témouchent from March 16 to 30 March 2013. The semifinalists will participate in 2013 FIFA U-20 World Cup.

Qualification

Qualified teams

Squads

Venues
In March 2012, the Algerian Football Federation announced that Algiers and Oran were the two candidate cities to host the competition. In May, Algiers was initially chosen as the host city of the competition. However, in August, the Algerian Football Federation announced that Oran and Aïn Témouchent would replace Algiers as the host cities, due to the lack of available stadiums in the latter city.

Draw
The draw for the tournament was held on 9 December 2012 in Cairo, Egypt.

Officials

Referees
Bamlack Tessema Weyesa (Ethiopia)
Maguette N'Diaye (Senegal)
Youssef Essrayri (Tunisia)
Bernard Camille (Seychelles)
Hudu Munyemana (Rwanda)
Reinhold Shikongo (Namibia)
Juste Zio (Burkina Faso)
Thierry Nkurunziza (Burundi)
Mehdi Abid Charef (Algeria)
Denis Dembele (Ivory Coast)
	
Reserve referees
Achille Madila (DR Congo)
Bakary Camara (Gambia)

Assistant referees 
Peter Sabatia (Kenya)
El Hadji Malick Samba (Senegal)
Balkrishna Bootun (Mauritius)
Anouar Hmila (Tunisia)
Jerson dos Santos (Angola)
Moussa Bayere (Ivory Coast)
Arsenio Marengula (Mozambique)
Yacine Hassan Egueh (Djibouti)
Mohamed Bechirene (Algeria)
Issa Yaya (Chad)
Sidiki Sidibe (Guinea)
Berhe Tesfargiorgh (Eritrea)
Seydou Tiama (Burkina Faso)
Elvis Guy Noupue Nguegoue (Cameroon)

Reserve assistant referees 
Kindie Mussie (Ethiopia)
Yahaya Mahamadou (Niger)

Group stage

Tiebreakers
Greater number of points obtained in the matches between the concerned teams
Best goal difference resulting from the matches between the concerned teams
Greatest number of goals scored in the matches between the concerned teams
Goal difference in all group matches
Greatest number of goals scored in all group matches
Fair Play point system in which the number of yellow and red cards are evaluated
Drawing of lots by CAF Organising Committee

Group A

Group B

Knockout stage

Semi-finals
Originally the games were scheduled to kick-off at 17:30 and 20:30. However CAF made changes on the 10 March so that both matches started at 17:00.

Third place match

Final

Winners

Player Awards

Top goalscorer:  Aminu Umar
Fair player of the tournament:  Francis Narh
Player of the tournament:  Saleh Gomaa

Team of the tournament

Starting Eleven
 Mossad Awad
 Ahmed Samir
 Boubacar Diarra
 Ramy Rabia
 Lawrence Lartey
 Abdul Jeleel Ajagun
 Derrick Mensah
 Saleh Gomaa
 Kahraba
 Zinedine Ferhat
 Ebenezer Assifuah

Substitutes
 Eric Ofori Antwi
 Tiékoro Keita
 Francis Narh
 Didier Ibrahim Ndong
 Emomo Eddy Ngoyi
 Mohammed Goyi Aliyu
 David Djigla
 Hossam Mohammed Ghaly

Goal scorers
4 goals
 Aminu Umar

3 goals

 Ebenezer Assifuah
 Kahraba

2 goals

 Saleh Gomaa
 Adama Niane
 Abdul Jeleel Ajagun

1 goal

 Ebenezer Ofori
 Seidu Salifu
 Jeremiah Arkorful
 Mahmoud Hamad
 Ramy Rabia
 Samba Diallo
 Tiékoro Keita
 Emomo Eddy Ngoyi

Countries to participate in 2013 FIFA U-20 World Cup
The top four teams qualified for 2013 FIFA U-20 World Cup:

See also
 2012 Accra Three Nations Cup - exhibition competition in preparation of the Championship

References

External links
2013 African U-20 Championship

 
2013
Youth
African Youth Championship
African Youth Championship
2013 in youth association football
Football